Anderson's stream snake (Opisthotropis andersonii), also known commonly as Anderson's mountain keelback, is a species of snake in the family Colubridae. The species is native to Asia

Etymology
The specific name, andersonii, is in honor of Scottish herpetologist John Anderson.

Geographic range
O. andersonii is found in Hong Kong and Vietnam.

Habitat

Description
Dorsally, O. andersonii is blackish olive. Ventrally it is whitish, except for the chin and lower labials which are brown. The snout is short, broad, and depressed. There is a single prefrontal, and only one pair of chin shields.

The dorsal scales, which are arranged in 17 rows throughout the entire length of the body, are smooth on the neck, feebly keeled at midbody, and strongly keeled on the tail. The tail is 15–20 % of the total length.

Reproduction
O. andersonii is oviparous.

References

Further reading
Boulenger GA (1888). "Description of two new Snakes from Hongkong, and Note on the Dentition of Hydrophis viperina". Annals and Magazine of Natural History, Sixth Series  2 : 43–45. (Calamohydrus andersonii, new species, p. 44).
Smith MA (1943). The Fauna of British India, Ceylon and Burma, Including the Whole of the Indo-Chinese Sub-region. Reptilia and Amphibia. Vol. III.—Serpentes. London: Secretary of State for India. (Taylor and Francis, printers). xii + 583 pp. ("Opisthotropis andersoni [sic]", p. 333).
Wang Y-Y, Guo Q, Liu Z-Y, Lyu Z-T, Wang J, Luo L, Sun Y-J, Zhang Y-W (2017). "Revisions of two poorly known species of Opisthotropis Günther, 1872 (Squamata: Colubridae: Natricinae) with description of a new species from China". Zootaxa 4247 (4): 391–412. (Opisthotropis andersonii, pp. 400–402, Figures 4A–4E + Figures 6c–6d on p. 405).

Opisthotropis
Reptiles described in 1888
Reptiles of Hong Kong
Reptiles of Vietnam
Snakes of Vietnam
Snakes of Asia
Taxa named by George Albert Boulenger